The Hundred-dollar, Hundred-digit Challenge problems are 10 problems in numerical mathematics published in 2002 by . A $100  prize was offered to whoever produced the most accurate solutions, measured up to 10 significant digits. The deadline for the contest was May 20, 2002. In the end, 20 teams solved all of the problems perfectly within the required precision, and an anonymous donor aided in producing the required prize monies. The challenge and its solutions were described in detail in the book .

The problems
From :
 
 A photon moving at speed 1 in the xy-plane starts at t = 0 at (x, y) = (0.5, 0.1) heading due east. Around every integer lattice point (i, j) in the plane, a circular mirror of radius 1/3 has been erected. How far from the origin is the photon at t = 10?
What is ?
 What is the global minimum of the function 
 Let , where  is the gamma function, and let  be the cubic polynomial that best approximates  on the unit disk in the supremum norm . What is ?
What is ?
What is the (1, 1) entry of ?
 A square plate  is at temperature . When does the temperature reach  at the center of the plate?
 The integral  depends on the parameter α. What is the value of α in [0, 5] at which I(α) achieves its maximum?
 A particle at the center of a 10×1 rectangle undergoes Brownian motion (i.e., 2D random walk with infinitesimal step lengths) till it hits the boundary. What is the probability that it hits at one of the ends rather than at one of the sides?

Solutions
0.3233674316
0.9952629194
1.274224152
−3.306868647
0.2143352345
0.06191395447
0.7250783462
0.4240113870
0.7859336743
3.837587979 × 10−7

References
 
 
  Review (June 2005) from Bulletin of the American Mathematical Society.
 

Numerical analysis
Recreational mathematics
Mathematics competitions